Lillian Zabar (c. 1905 – 22 December 1995) was a Russian Empire-born entrepreneur and co-founder of Zabar's delicatessen.

Biography
Lillian Teit was born around 1905 in the Russian Empire. She claimed it was her 90th birthday the day she died but all that is known is that she was born at Hanukkah but not exactly which year. In the 1920s she arrived in the United States fleeing the persecution of Jews in Ukraine. She gave a younger age to prevent any chance of being sent home as too old. She initially lived in Philadelphia before moving to New York. Louis Zabar was from the same village. Zabar was a talented cook while her husband was interested in deli food. She specialised in potato salad and coleslaw as well as the popular blintzes and they opened their first delicatessen in 1934 in Brooklyn before later moving to Manhattan. The couple had three children; Saul, Stanley, and Eli.

Sources

1900s births
1995 deaths
Emigrants from the Russian Empire to the United States
Businesspeople from New York City